The 1982 Alaska gubernatorial election took place on November 2, 1982, for the post of Governor of Alaska.  To replace outgoing Republican governor Jay Hammond, Democratic nominee Bill Sheffield defeated three opponents: Republican nominee Tom Fink, Libertarian nominee Dick Randolph and Alaskan Independence Party nominee Joe Vogler.  Hammond had endorsed his lieutenant governor, Terry Miller, who lost the Republican nomination to Fink in the primary election, as did Don Wright. Sheffield defeated Steve Cowper and former Lieutenant Governor H. A. Boucher for the Democratic nomination.

Randolph was one of the few third party candidates in Alaska's history to have served in office, serving two terms as a Libertarian in the state house before running for governor. Randolph, as a member of a political party not recognized by the state, gained access to the ballot via a nominating petition.  He garnered nearly fifteen percent of the vote, to date the highest percentage received by any Libertarian Party gubernatorial candidate.  His running mate, Donnis Thompson, who was married to the mayor of the Kenai Peninsula Borough, was the only woman on a statewide ballot in this year's elections, as well as one of the first in Alaskan history.

Results

References

Gubernatorial
1982
Alaska